Koyunevi may refer to:

 Koyunevi, Ayvacık
 Koyunevi, İmamoğlu